HMX is an explosive.

HMX may also refer to:

 Harmonix Music Systems, a video game developer
 Hmong–Mien languages, spoken in China and Southeast Asia
 Kasson Crooker, also known as DJ HMX, American electronic musician
Marine Helicopter Squadron One, also known as HMX-1, a United States Marine Corps aviation unit